Formiche Alto is a municipality located in the province of Teruel, Aragon, Spain. According to the 2004 census (INE), the municipality had a population of 191 inhabitants.
According to the 2010 census, the municipality has a population of 190 inhabitants. Its postal code is 44440

This town is located in the Gúdar-Javalambre comarca, at the feet of the Sierra de Camarena, Sistema Ibérico.

See also
Gúdar-Javalambre
List of municipalities in Teruel

References

External links

Asociación Cultural "Cabezo Alto"

Municipalities in the Province of Teruel